Standing on the Shoulder of Giants is the fourth studio album by English rock band Oasis, released on 28 February 2000. It was the band's first album under their new record label Big Brother Recordings.  In the year preceding the album's release, Alan McGee closed Creation Records, and Oasis had lost two founding members (Paul "Bonehead" Arthurs and Paul "Guigsy" McGuigan) and hired new producer Mark "Spike" Stent to replace Owen Morris.

The album marked a significant change from the Britpop scene to a modern psychedelic record complete with drum loops, samples, electric sitar, mellotron, synthesizers and backward guitars, resulting in an album more experimental with electronica and heavy psychedelic rock influences. Songs such as "Go Let It Out", the Indian-influenced "Who Feels Love?", and the progressive "Gas Panic!" departed from the band's earlier style. This album also marked the first time that lead singer Liam Gallagher contributed on songwriting ("Little James"), and this tradition was continued for their subsequent albums, instead of primarily Noel Gallagher's songwriting in the first three albums.

It is the 16th-fastest-selling album in UK chart history, selling over 310,000 copies in its first week. Standing on the Shoulder of Giants has been certified double platinum by the British Phonographic Industry and has sold around 208,000 copies in the US.

Background
The album's title misquotes an expression by Sir Isaac Newton: "If I have seen further, it is by standing on the shoulders of giants". Noel Gallagher saw the quote on the edge of a £2 coin while in a pub, and liked it so much he thought it would be a suitable name for Oasis' new album. He then wrote the name on the side of a cigarette packet while drunk, and upon awakening in the morning, he realised he had written "Standing on the Shoulder of Giants". He had also accidentally written "a bum title" on the packet instead of "album title".

Noel decided to drop the equipment used in the three previous albums and instead buy "loads of really weird pedals, old guitars, and small amps" as the lack of a deadline on the album allowed him to "take quite a few days just messing around" and experiment with new musical landscapes. Noel was forced to play nearly all the instruments on the album, aided by some additional musicians; due to the departure of two founding band members (guitarist Bonehead and bassist Guigsy) while the album was still being recorded, their parts were re-recorded for legal reasons. The album features Noel and Liam Gallagher alongside drummer Alan White, who are also the only ones depicted on the sleeve of the album.

Songs
The album spawned four singles, released between February and July 2000.

The lead track, "Fuckin' in the Bushes", features no vocals, but does include sampled quotes from Message to Love, a documentary film of the Isle of Wight Festival 1970. The festival's MC, Rikki Farr, is heard berating the crowd: "We put this festival on, you bastards, with a lot of love! We worked for one year for you pigs! And you wanna break our walls down and you wanna destroy it? Well you go to hell!" Two other festival observers in the film are also heard.

"Gas Panic!" was inspired by the panic attacks Noel Gallagher was having as he quit drugs in advance of the birth of his daughter Anaïs. "'Gas Panic!' was written while I was just lying in bed sweating, the usual five or six o'clock in the morning, thinking, f—ing hell, you know, is it all worth it?" he said.

Walmart chose not to sell the album, objecting to "Fuckin' in the Bushes" having profanity in the title.

Album cover
The album's artwork features the photo of the Manhattan skyline taken from the rooftop of 500 Fifth Avenue (5th Ave/W 42nd St). Some famous buildings can be seen here, for example the Empire State Building is seen in front and the former World Trade Center is seen in the back. To create the cover photo, the photographer captured the same frame every half an hour in 18 hours during the whole day's course; the photos were digitally composited into the final picture. All of the singles released from this album contained artwork that was based on the album artwork; the shot used for "Go Let It Out" can be seen above one of the buildings at the front, which depicts five men playing football. This shot was taken from the roof of a football stadium, and the footballers from the car park were edited onto the rooftop on the final cover.

Reception

The album received mixed reviews from critics. The B-side to "Go Let It Out", "Let's All Make Believe", was featured in Q'''s top 500 lost tracks, who also said that if "Let's All Make Believe" were on the album, "it probably would have carried the album to another star." However, Q later included the record at number 46 in their list of the 50 worst albums ever made.

Despite its lukewarm critical reception, both Liam and Noel Gallagher have praised certain aspects of the record. During a radio interview with Gary Crowley in 2002 Liam said "Some people reckon the album is shit, but I think it's a great album ... it's just a bit different", whilst Noel Gallagher has stated that he regards "Go Let It Out" as "up there with some of the best things that I've done." He also stated in a 2005 interview with Rock Profiles that he thinks "Fuckin' in the Bushes", "Go Let It Out", "Gas Panic!", and "Where Did It All Go Wrong?" are "real pieces of music". Noel has also praised the sounds and production of the record.Standing on the Shoulder of Giants spent 29 weeks on the UK album chart, the fewest for any Oasis studio album. It was the 26th biggest selling album of 2000 in the UK.Standing on the Shoulder of Giants debuted at number 24 on the Billboard 200 in the US, selling about 55,000 units in its first week, but sales slumped its second week and fell to No. 84 with a 64% sales drop. The album received a huge sales hike following the VH1 airing of the group's Behind the Music in April 2000, jumping from No. 194 to No. 113 on the Billboard 200 the week following the episode's airing. In March 2000, the IFPI certified Oasis for selling one million units of the album in Europe.

Legacy
In a 2011 interview with Grantland'', Noel disowned the album, stating that it should have never been made. He recalled that he "had no reason or desire to make music" and "just wrote songs for the sake of making an album". He also clarified that adding Archer and Bell allowed the band to split songwriting duties, as he felt he "could[n't] keep writing 20 songs every two years".

Track listing

Personnel

Oasis
Liam Gallagher – vocals (2–6, 9–10)
Noel Gallagher – lead and rhythm guitar, bass guitar, keyboards, backing vocals, lead vocals (7–8), co-lead vocals (4), production
Alan White – drums, percussion

Additional personnel
Paul Stacey – keyboards, additional lead guitar (1), backwards guitar (3), bass guitar (3, 6, 9–10), additional acoustic guitar (7)
P. P. Arnold and Linda Lewis – backing vocals (1, 4, 10)
Mark Coyle – electric sitar (4), twelve-string acoustic guitar (5)
Mark Feltham – harmonica (6)
Charlotte Glasson – flute (6)

Production
Mark Stent – production, engineering
Paul Stacey – engineering
Wayne Wilkins – assistant engineering
Paul "P-Dub" Walton – assistant engineering
Aaron Pratley – assistant engineering
Howie Weinberg – mastering
Jan "Stan" Kybert – programming, Pro Tools
Steve "Rambo" Robinson – studio assistant

Charts

Weekly charts

Year-end charts

Certifications

References

External links

Standing on the Shoulder of Giants at YouTube (streamed copy where licensed)

2000 albums
Big Brother Recordings albums
Epic Records albums
Oasis (band) albums
Albums recorded at Wheeler End Studios
Albums produced by Spike Stent
Albums recorded at Olympic Sound Studios